John Gilbert Layton  (July 18, 1950 – August 22, 2011) was a Canadian academic and politician who served as the leader of the New Democratic Party (NDP) from 2003 to 2011 and leader of the Official Opposition in 2011. He previously sat on Toronto City Council, occasionally holding the title of acting mayor or deputy mayor of Toronto during his tenure as city councillor. Layton was the member of Parliament (MP) for Toronto—Danforth from 2004 until his death.

The son of a Progressive Conservative cabinet minister, Layton was raised in Hudson, Quebec. He rose to prominence in Toronto municipal politics, where he was one of the most prominent left-wing voices on the city and Metropolitan Toronto councils, championing many progressive causes. In 1991, he ran for mayor, losing to June Rowlands. Returning to council, he rose to become head of the Federation of Canadian Municipalities. In 2003, he was elected leader of the NDP on the first ballot of the convention.

Under his leadership, support for the NDP increased in each election. The party's popular vote almost doubled in the 2004 election, which gave the NDP the balance of power in Paul Martin's minority government. In May 2005, the NDP supported the Liberal budget in exchange for major amendments, in what was promoted as Canada's "first NDP budget". In November of that year, Layton voted with other opposition parties to defeat the Liberal government over the findings of the Gomery Commission. The NDP saw further gains in the 2006 and 2008 elections, in which the party elected 29 and 37 MPs, respectively.

In the 2011 election, Layton led the NDP to the most successful result in the party's history, winning 103 seats—enough for the party to form the Official Opposition for the first time. Federal support for Layton and the NDP in the election was unprecedented, especially in the province of Quebec, where the party won 59 out of 75 seats.

Layton died on August 22, 2011, after being diagnosed with cancer. He was survived by his wife of 23 years, fellow Toronto MP Olivia Chow. Details of the type and spread of the cancer, and the exact cause of death, were not released to the public. Shortly before he died, Layton had nominated Nycole Turmel as interim leader of the NDP and, consequently, of the Official Opposition. Tom Mulcair won the NDP leadership contest to replace Layton.

Early life and education
Layton was born in Montreal and raised in nearby Hudson, Quebec, a largely Anglophone community. His parents were Doris Elizabeth (née Steeves), a grand-niece of William Steeves, a Father of Confederation, and Progressive Conservative MP Robert Layton. He was the grandson of Gilbert Layton, who served as a minister without portfolio the government of Quebec's Union Nationale Premier Maurice Duplessis. He was elected student council president of his high school, Hudson High School, and his yearbook predicted that he would become a politician; he would later also credit Billy Bryans, who went on to become a prominent musician with the band the Parachute Club, for having played a role in his student council victory. He graduated from McGill University in 1970 with an honours Bachelor of Arts (BA) in political science and became a member of the Sigma Chi fraternity.

In 1969–70, he was the prime minister of the Quebec Youth Parliament.

Layton credited a professor at McGill, the political philosopher Charles Taylor, with being the primary influence in his decision to switch from a science degree to an arts degree. Moreover, it was on Taylor's advice that he pursued his doctorate at University of Toronto to study under political philosopher C. B. Macpherson.

In a foreword Layton wrote for Canadian Idealism and the Philosophy of Freedom, he explains, "The idealist current holds that human society has the potential to achieve liberty when people work together to form a society in which equality means more than negative liberty, the absolute and protected right to run races against each other to determine winners. Idealists imagine a positive liberty that enables us to build together toward common objectives that fulfill and even surpass our individual goals." Upon reading Canadian Idealism and the Philosophy of Freedom, Layton came to understand himself as part of the intellectual tradition of Canadian idealists.

In 1970, the family moved to Toronto, where Layton graduated the following year from York University with a Master of Arts (MA) in political science; and later in 1983, he completed his Doctor of Philosophy (PhD) in political science at York. In 1974, Layton became a professor at Ryerson Polytechnical Institute (now Toronto Metropolitan University). Over the next decade, he taught at Ryerson, York, and University of Toronto. He also became a prominent activist for a variety of causes. He wrote several books, including Homelessness: The Making and Unmaking of a Crisis and a book on general public policy, Speaking Out.

Family and personal life

Layton's great-granduncle, William Steeves, was a Father of Confederation. His great-grandfather, Philip E. Layton, was a blind activist who founded the Montreal Association for the Blind in 1908 and led a campaign for disability pensions in the 1930s. Philip was the senior partner in the family business, Layton Bros. Pianos. Layton Pianos had been made in London, England, since 1837, and Philip had emigrated to Montreal at the age of 19. Philip was a blind organist, composer ("Dominion March", played on carillon at Jack's lying-in-state), piano tuner, and piano retailer. The family business survives as Layton Audio in Montreal.

Jack Layton's grandfather, Gilbert Layton, was a Quebec cabinet minister in the Union Nationale government of Maurice Duplessis and resigned due to the provincial government's lack of support for Canadian participation in World War II. His father, Robert Layton, was a Liberal Party activist in the 1960s and 1970s, and served as a Progressive Conservative member of Parliament and federal Cabinet minister in the 1980s under Prime Minister Brian Mulroney.

Layton was raised as a member of the United Church of Canada, and was a member of the Bloor Street United Church parish in Toronto. However, he also sometimes attended services at the Metropolitan Community Church of Toronto, whose pastor, Brent Hawkes, was a longtime NDP activist and a personal friend of Layton's.

In 1969, at age 19, Jack married his high school sweetheart Sally Halford, with whom he had two children: Mike, currently a Toronto City Councillor, and Sarah, currently a senior staffer for the Stephen Lewis Foundation. Layton and Halford's marriage ended in divorce in 1983 after 14 years.

Layton first met Olivia Chow in 1985 during an auction at Village by the Grange, in which Jack was the auctioneer and Olivia was the interpreter for the Cantonese language observers. They had been previously acquainted, however they realized that they were both candidates in the upcoming election and decided to have lunch together to talk about the campaign. Three weeks after the auction, they went on their first date. Olivia's mother did not approve of Jack at first, because of his race as well as him not being a lawyer or doctor. Jack was invited to dinner at the home of Olivia's mother, where they also played mahjong. After the dinner, Jack attempted to thank Olivia's mother in Cantonese, however Jack's incorrect tone had him inadvertently saying, "Thank you for the good sex." Layton stated "My faux pas broke the ice completely. We've been good buddies ever since."

Layton was known for playing music and singing songs at party gatherings. Alberta NDP leader Brian Mason remembered during the three-day board meetings when Layton was running for president of the Federation of Canadian Municipalities: "He would gather people together in his hotel room and play the guitar and get everybody singing old folk songs from the 1960s. He just got people involved, just with his personality, not politics."

Layton was a keen Trekkie, having a custom Starfleet uniform made by a tailor. Layton was famously photographed wearing his uniform at a Star Trek convention in 1991.

At the 2005 Parliamentary Press Gallery Dinner (typically a satirical event), Layton sent up himself and his party, playing guitar and singing three songs: "Party for Sale or Rent" (to the tune of "King of the Road"), a re-worked version of "Nobody Knows You When You're Down and Out" with different humorous lyrics, and "If I Had Another $4.6 Billion".

Toronto City Council
At York and Ryerson, Layton developed close links with a number of Toronto figures including John Sewell and David Crombie. He was first elected to Toronto City Council in 1982, in a surprise upset against incumbent Gordon Chong. He quickly became one of the most outspoken members of council, and a leader of the left wing. He was one of the most vocal opponents of the massive SkyDome project, and an early advocate for rights for AIDS patients. In 1984, he was fined for trespassing when he handed out leaflets at the Toronto Eaton Centre during a strike by Eaton's staff, but the charge was later thrown out on freedom of speech grounds. Layton was also one of the few opponents to Toronto's bid for the 1996 Summer Olympics. In 1985, he moved to the Metropolitan Toronto Council, in the first direct elections for members of that body. In the 1988 municipal elections, Layton traded places with city council ally Dale Martin, with Martin going to Metro and Layton returning to Toronto City Council. Layton was easily elected in a contest with former high school teacher Lois MacMillan-Walker. The election was a major victory for Layton as the reformist coalition of which he was the de facto head gained control of city council, the first time in city history a coalition of New Democrats and independents controlled council.

On July 9, 1988, he married Hong Kong-born Toronto District School Board trustee Olivia Chow in a ceremony on Algonquin Island. Their whitewater rafting honeymoon plans had to be abandoned, however, when days before the wedding Layton collided with a newspaper box while bicycling. Chow later joined Layton on the Toronto City Council. She has been a candidate for the federal New Democrats five times, first winning her seat the third time in a close race against Tony Ianno in the 2006 Canadian election, and re-elected in 2008 and 2011. Chow resigned from federal politics in 2014 to run for mayor of Toronto; she placed third.

Layton and Chow were also the subject of some dispute when a June 14, 1990, Toronto Star article by Tom Kerr accused them of unfairly living in a housing cooperative subsidized by the federal government, despite their high income. Layton and Chow had both lived in the Hazelburn co-op since 1985, and lived together in an $800 per month three-bedroom apartment after their marriage in 1988. By 1990, their combined annual income was $120,000, and in March of that year they began voluntarily paying an additional $325 per month to offset their share of the co-op's Canada Mortgage and Housing Corporation subsidy, the only members of the co-op to do so. In response to the article, the co-op's board argued that having mixed-income tenants was crucial to the success of co-ops, and that the laws deliberately set aside apartments for those willing to pay market rates, such as Layton and Chow. During the late 1980s and early 1990s they maintained approximately 30% of their units as low income units and provided the rest at what they considered market rent. In June 1990, the city solicitor cleared the couple of any wrongdoing, and later that month, Layton and Chow left the co-op and bought a house in Toronto's Chinatown together with Chow's mother, a move they said had been planned for some time. Former Toronto mayor John Sewell later wrote in NOW that rival Toronto city councillor Tom Jakobek had given the story to Tom Kerr.

Originally known for coming to council meetings in blue jeans with unkempt hair, Layton worked to change his image to run for mayor in the 1991 civic election. He also started wearing contact lenses, abandoning his glasses, and traded in his blue jeans for suits. In February 1991, Layton became the first official NDP candidate for the mayoralty, pitting him against centrist incumbent Art Eggleton. In a move that surprised many, Eggleton elected not to run again.

Layton was opposed by three right-of-centre candidates: Susan Fish, June Rowlands, and Betty Disero. Right-wing support soon coalesced around former city councillor Rowlands, preventing the internal divisions Layton needed to win office. Layton was also hurt by the growing unpopularity of the provincial NDP government of Bob Rae, and by his earlier opposition to Toronto's Olympic bid. Bid organizer Paul Henderson accused Layton and his allies of costing Toronto the event. Despite this, October polls showed Layton only four points behind Rowlands, with 36% support. However, on October 17, Fish, a former provincial Progressive Conservative cabinet minister who had only 19% support, pulled out of the race, and many of her supporters moved to Rowlands. Layton lost the November 12 election by a considerable margin. However, in the same election Olivia Chow easily won a seat on city council.

In November 1991, Layton co-founded the White Ribbon Campaign of men working to end male violence against women. Layton returned to academia and also founded the Green Catalyst Group Inc., an environmental consulting business. In 1993, he ran for the House of Commons in the riding of Rosedale for the NDP, but finished fourth in the generally Liberal riding. In 1994, he returned to Metropolitan Toronto Council, succeeding Roger Hollander in the Don River ward, and he resumed his high-profile role in local politics; following the "megacity" merger of Metropolitan Toronto into the current city of Toronto, he was again re-elected to Toronto City Council, serving alongside Pam McConnell in a two-member ward. He remained on Toronto City Council until pursuing the leadership of the federal New Democrats. He also came to national attention as the leader of the Federation of Canadian Municipalities. Federally, he ran again in the 1997 election, this time in the neighbouring riding of Toronto—Danforth, but lost to incumbent Dennis Mills by a wide margin. In June 1999, as chair of Toronto's environmental task force, the Toronto Atmospheric Fund, he was instrumental in the preliminary phases of the WindShare wind power cooperative in Toronto through the Toronto Renewable Energy Co-operative.

Leader of the NDP
Layton was elected leader of the NDP at the party's leadership convention in Toronto, on January 25, 2003. Layton won on the first ballot with 53.5% of the vote, defeating Bill Blaikie, Lorne Nystrom, Joe Comartin and Pierre Ducasse. His campaign was focused on the need to reinvigorate the party, and was prominently endorsed by former NDP leader Ed Broadbent.

Layton did not seek election to the House of Commons by running in a by-election, as is the tradition among new party leaders without a seat. Instead, he waited until the 2004 federal election to contest the riding of Toronto—Danforth against Liberal Dennis Mills. With no seat in the House of Commons, he appointed the runner-up, longtime Winnipeg-area MP Bill Blaikie, as parliamentary leader. Although he had no parliamentary seat, Layton was noted for drawing considerable attention from the Canadian mass media. Much of his rhetoric involved attacking the policies of then Canadian Prime Minister Paul Martin as conservative, and arguing the ideology of the Liberal Party of Canada had shifted in a more right wing direction. Another focus of Layton's leadership was to focus the party's efforts on Quebec, one of the party's weaker provinces. One of his opponents in the leadership race, Pierre Ducasse, was the first Québécois to run for leader of the NDP. After the race, Layton appointed Ducasse as his Quebec lieutenant and party spokesperson.

The result of Layton's efforts was a strong increase in the party's support. By the end of 2003, the party was polling higher than both the Canadian Alliance or the Progressive Conservatives and it was even suggested that the next election could see the NDP in place as Official Opposition.

2004 election

During the 2004 Canadian federal election, controversy erupted over Layton's accusation that Liberal Prime Minister Paul Martin was responsible for the deaths of homeless people because he failed to provide funding for affordable housing. While rates of homelessness and homeless deaths increased during the eleven years of Liberal government, the link to Martin's decisions was indirect as affordable housing is a mainly provincial jurisdiction. Layton's charge was defended by some, including the Ottawa Citizen, but most attacked it as inaccurate and negative campaigning. Moreover, the controversy consumed the campaign, overshadowing policy announcements over the next week.

Further controversy followed as Layton suggested the removal of the Clarity Act, considered by some to be vital to keeping Quebec in Canada and by others as undemocratic, and promised to recognize any declaration of independence by Quebec after a referendum. This position was not part of the NDP's official party policy, leading some high-profile party members, such as NDP House leader Bill Blaikie and former NDP leader Alexa McDonough, to publicly indicate that they did not share Layton's views. His position on the Clarity Act was reversed in the 2006 election to one of support.

Layton also continued his effort to improve his party's standing in Quebec. The NDP ran French-language ads in the province and Layton, who spoke colloquial Québécois French, appeared in them. He advocated replacing the first-past-the-post system with proportional representation. He threatened to use the NDP's clout in the event of a minority government. However, it was dismissed out of hand by the Liberal and Bloc Québécois leaders, as they tend to be favored by the first-past-the-post system, normally being allocated a greater proportion of seats than the proportion of votes cast for them. Historically, the NDP's popular vote does not translate into a proportional number of seats because of scattered support. This was most opposed by the Bloc Québécois, who usually had the lowest popular vote but nonetheless won many seats because their support was concentrated in Quebec. Despite these problems, Layton led the NDP to a 15% popular vote, its highest in 16 years. However, it only won 19 seats in the House of Commons, two less than the 21 won under Alexa McDonough in 1997, and far short of the 40 that Layton predicted on the eve of the election. However, some potential NDP voters may have voted Liberal to prevent a possible Conservative win. Olivia Chow and several other prominent Toronto NDP candidates lost tight races and Layton won his own seat against incumbent Liberal Dennis Mills by a much narrower margin than early polls indicated.

Liberal minority government

With the ruling Liberal Party being reduced to a minority government, revelations of the sponsorship scandal damaging its popularity to the point where both the Conservative Party and the Bloc Québécois were pressing their advantage for a snap election, the prime minister approached the NDP for its support. Layton demanded the cancellation of proposed corporate tax cuts and called for an increase in social spending. The ensuing compromise in the NDP's favour was protested by the other opposition parties who used it as a pretext to force a non-confidence vote. On May 19, two such votes were defeated and Layton's amendments went on to be passed on its final reading vote on June 23. As a result of this political coup and his apparent civil behaviour in a spitefully raucous parliament, many political analysts noted that Layton gained increased credibility as an effective leader of an important party, becoming the major second choice leader in many political polls – for example, polling second in Quebec after Gilles Duceppe, despite the low polls for his party as a whole in the province.

In mid-November 2005, when Liberal support dropped after the Gomery Commission delivered its first report, Layton offered the prime minister several conditions in return for the NDP's continued support, most notably on the issue of privatization of health care in Canada, where Layton wanted strict provisions for controlling public spending on private health care delivery, saying that without "significant action" on the issue, "Mr. Martin can't count on our support." Martin for his part offered no comment on a meeting held to discuss the issue, only saying that it was a "good meeting", while Layton publicly expressed his disappointment at the outcome. Layton announced he would introduce a motion requesting a February election. However, the Martin government refused to allow the election date to be decided by the opposition. A motion of non-confidence followed, moved by Stephen Harper and seconded by Layton, triggering the 2006 federal election. Layton was working with the Liberal government, but determined he would have a better chance of electoral success by voting against the government and having an election.

Coalition attempt with the Bloc Québécois and the Conservatives
On March 26, 2011, in response to Harper's allegations that a coalition is not a legitimate or principled way to form government, Duceppe stated that Harper had once tried to form a coalition government with the Bloc Québécois and NDP. In 2004 Stephen Harper privately met with Bloc Québécois leader Gilles Duceppe and Layton in a Montreal hotel. The meeting that took place between the three party leaders happened two months before the federal election. On September 9, 2004, the three signed a letter addressed to then-Governor General Adrienne Clarkson, stating,

On the same day the letter was written, the three party leaders held a joint press conference at which they expressed their intent to co-operate on changing parliamentary rules, and to request that the governor general consult with them before deciding to call an election. At the news conference, Harper said "It is the Parliament that's supposed to run the country, not just the largest party and the single leader of that party. That's a criticism I've had and that we've had and that most Canadians have had for a long, long time now so this is an opportunity to start to change that." However, at the time, Harper and the two other opposition leaders denied trying to form a coalition government. Harper said, "This is not a coalition, but this is a co-operative effort."

One month later, on October 4, Mike Duffy, now a Conservative senator (appointed by Harper), said "It is possible that you could change prime minister without having an election", and that some Conservatives wanted Harper as prime minister. The next day Layton walked out on talks with Harper and Duceppe, accusing them of trying to replace Paul Martin with Harper as prime minister. Both Bloc and Conservative officials denied Layton's accusations.

2006 campaign

With a vote scheduled for January 23, 2006, many New Democrats expected Layton to deliver substantially more seats than he did in 2004. They hoped the NDP would hold the balance of power in a new minority Parliament, so that they could carry additional leverage in negotiating with the governing party. Mike Klander, the executive vice-president of the federal Liberals' Ontario wing, resigned after making posts on his blog comparing Chow to a Chow Chow dog and calling Layton an "asshole".

Through the course of the campaign, Layton attempted to cast himself as the sole remaining champion of universal health care. Some opinion polls showed that Canadians found Layton the most appealing and charismatic of the leaders. Layton repeatedly insisted that "Canadians have a third choice", and urged Liberals to "lend us your vote". Some commentators and pundits mocked Layton for over-using these catchphrases instead of explaining the NDP platform.

The NDP strategy had changed in that they were focusing their attacks on the Liberals rather than in 2004, where they criticized both the Liberals and Conservatives in equal measure, prompting some criticism from Paul Martin. Andrew Coyne suggested that the NDP not only wanted to disassociate themselves from the scandal-ridden Liberals, but also because the Liberals were likely to receive credit for legislation achieved under the Liberal-NDP partnership. The NDP had also lost close races in the 2004 election due to the Liberals' strategic voting. Early in the campaign, NDP MP Judy Wasylycia-Leis had asked the Royal Canadian Mounted Police (RCMP) to launch a criminal investigation into the leaking of the income trust announcement. The criminal probe seriously damaged the Liberal campaign and preventing them from making their key policy announcements, as well as bringing alleged Liberal corruption back into the spotlight.

Layton's campaign direction also caused a break between him and Canadian Auto Workers union head Buzz Hargrove over the issue of strategic voting. Hargrove preferred a Liberal minority government supported by the NDP and he had earlier criticized Layton for participating in the motion of non-confidence that brought down the Liberal government. Hargrove allied with the Liberals and publicly stated that he "did not like the campaign that Jack Layton was running", criticizing Layton for "spending too much time attacking the Liberals". During the final week of the campaign, knowing that last-minute strategic voting had cost the NDP seats in several close ridings during the 2004 election, Hargrove and Martin urged all progressive voters to unite behind the Liberal banner to stop a Conservative government.

Layton intensified his attacks on the Liberal scandals, pledging to use his minority clout to keep the Conservatives in check. Shortly after the election, the Ontario provincial branch of the NDP revoked Hargrove's party membership because he had violated the party's constitution by campaigning for other parties during an election campaign, though Layton disagreed with this. Hargrove retaliated by severing ties with the NDP at the annual CAW convention. The election increased the NDP's total seats to 29 seats, up from 18 before dissolution. Among the new NDP candidates elected was Olivia Chow, making the two only the second husband-and-wife team in Canadian Parliament history (Gurmant Grewal and Nina Grewal were the first husband-and-wife team in Canadian Parliament after the 2004 federal election). In the end, the NDP succeeded in increasing their parliamentary representation to 29 MPs, though they had significantly fewer seats than the Bloc Québécois (51) or the Opposition Liberals (103).

Conservative minority government

At the NDP's 22nd Convention, held on September 10, 2006, in Quebec City, Layton received a 92% approval rating in a leadership vote, tying former Reform Party leader Preston Manning's record for this kind of voting. This record was later broken in 2016 by Elizabeth May of the Green Party of Canada. At the same convention, the NDP passed a motion calling for the return of Canadian Forces from Afghanistan. On September 24, 2006, he met with Afghan President Hamid Karzai to discuss the NDP position. After the meeting Layton stated that Canada's role should be focused on traditional peacekeeping and reconstruction rather than in a front line combat role currently taking place.

Layton and his caucus voted to support the new proposed rules for income trusts introduced by the Conservatives October 31, 2006. The short-term result of the tax policy announcement was a loss to Canadian investors of $20 billion, the largest ever loss attributed to a change in government policy.

Layton threatened to move a motion of non-confidence against the government over the "Clean Air Act" unless action was taken to improve the bill and its approach to environmental policy. Prime Minister Harper agreed to put an end to the Parliamentary logjam by sending the bill to a special legislative committee before second reading. He released his proposed changes to the "Clean Air Act" on November 19, 2006.

On June 3, 2008, Layton voted to implement a program which would "allow conscientious objectors ... to a war not sanctioned by the United Nations ... to ... remain in Canada ..." Layton led the NDP to be instrumental in taking action on the peace issue of Canada and Iraq War resisters.

On June 11, 2008, Prime Minister Stephen Harper made it known that he had received private counsel from Layton on the matter of Indian residential schools and the apology to former students of the schools. Before delivering the apology, Harper thanked Layton.

2008 campaign

Layton started off the 2008 federal election campaign with a speech similar to that of US presidential nominee Barack Obama. Layton denied he was trying to draw comparisons with Obama, saying "I mean, I am a lot shorter than he is. He is a brilliant orator. I'm never going to claim to be that. But what I have noticed is that the key issues faced by the American middle class, the working people of the U.S. and their concerns about their families' futures, are awfully similar to the issues that I hear in Canada." Layton said that he has also written to Obama and Hillary Clinton saying that the North American Free Trade Agreement had hurt working people in both countries "and those stories have to be told."

Layton, along with Prime Minister Harper and Bloc Québécois leader Gilles Duceppe, initially opposed the inclusion of Green Party leader Elizabeth May in the leaders' televised debates. Layton initially said that he was following the rules of the broadcast consortium, while NDP spokesman Brad Lavigne confirmed that Layton had refused to attend if May was present, noting that May had endorsed Liberal leader Stéphane Dion for prime minister, and arguing that her inclusion would in effect give the Liberals two representatives at the debate. Rod Love, former chief of staff to Ralph Klein, suggested that the Greens could potentially cut into the NDP's support. Layton's stance drew criticism from the YWCA, Judy Rebick, and members of his own party. Layton dropped his opposition to May's inclusion on September 10, 2008. "This whole issue of debating about the debate has become a distraction to the real debate that needs to happen", Layton said. "I have only one condition for this debate and that is that the prime minister is there."

In October 2008, Layton posted an online video message speaking out in favour of net neutrality, torrent sites, video-sharing sites, and social-networking sites. In a separate interview he said that increasing corporate control "is very, very dangerous and we have put the whole issue of net neutrality right into the heart of our campaign platform", and that the Internet is "a public tool for exchanging ideas and I particularly want to say that if we don’t fight to preserve it, we could lose it." In the end, the NDP gained 8 new seats, taking its tally to 37. This result still left the NDP as Canada's fourth party, behind the Bloc Québécois with 50. The NDP managed to retain Outremont, held by Tom Mulcair, its only seat in the province.

Continued Conservative minority government

The 40th session of Parliament began on November 27, 2008, with a fiscal update by the Conservatives that outlined their agenda for the upcoming term. This included a temporary suspension of federal employees' right to strike and a removal of monetary subsidies for political parties. All three opposition parties including the NDP stated that they could not support this position. Layton along with Liberal leader Stéphane Dion and Bloc Québécois leader Gilles Duceppe began negotiations to form a coalition that would replace the Conservatives as the government. The three opposition parties planned to table a motion of non-confidence in the House of Commons, and counted on the likelihood that the Governor General Michaëlle Jean, would invite the coalition to govern instead of dissolving parliament and calling an election so soon after the last election.

On December 1, 2008, the three opposition leaders signed an accord that laid down the basis for an agreement on a coalition government. The proposed structure would be a coalition between the Liberals and the NDP, with the New Democrats getting six Cabinet positions. Both parties agreed to continue the coalition until June 30, 2011. The Bloc Québécois would not be formally part of the government but would provide support on confidence motions for 18 months.

Opposition to the proposed coalition developed in all provinces except Quebec. On December 4, 2008, the governor general granted Prime Minister Harper's request to prorogue Parliament until January 26, 2009, at which time Harper had planned to introduce the budget. Dion had since been ousted from the leadership of the Liberals and his successor, Michael Ignatieff, had distanced himself from the coalition.

Layton remained committed to ousting the Harper government, pledging that the NDP would vote against the Conservative budget regardless of what it contained. Layton urged Ignatieff's Liberal Party to topple the Conservatives before the shelf life of the coalition expired; constitutional experts said that four months after the last election, if the government fell, the governor general would likely grant the prime minister's request to dissolve Parliament instead of inviting the coalition.

On January 28, 2009, the Liberals agreed to support the Conservative budget with an amendment, ending the possibility of the coalition, so Layton said "Today we have learned that you can't trust Mr. Ignatieff to oppose Mr. Harper. If you oppose Mr. Harper and you want a new government, I urge you to support the NDP."

In March 2009, the NDP, under Layton's leadership, re-introduced a motion (first passed June 3, 2008) which, if implemented, would allow conscientious objectors to the Iraq War to remain in Canada. The motion again passed March 30, 2009, by 129–125, but it was non-binding. In a leadership review vote held at the NDP's August 2009 federal policy convention, 89.25% of delegates voted against holding a leadership convention to replace Layton. In October 2009, Layton paired up with the Stephen Lewis Foundation to raise money for HIV/AIDS affected families in Africa. As part of the foundation's A Dare to Remember campaign, Layton busked on a busy street corner.

Layton's son, Mike was elected to Toronto City Council in the 2010 city council election.

In early 2011, Layton was featured in an episode of CBC Television's Make the Politician Work.

The Conservative government was defeated in a no-confidence vote on March 25, 2011, with the motion gaining full support of all opposition parties including the New Democrats, after the government was found in contempt of Parliament. It was the first time in Commonwealth history that a government lost the confidence of the House of Commons on the grounds of contempt of Parliament. The no-confidence motion was carried with a vote of 156 in favour of the motion, and 145 against, thus resulting in the prime minister advising a dissolution of Parliament and a federal election.

2011 campaign

The day after the successful passing of the motion, Layton started the NDP election campaign, first with a speech in Ottawa followed later in the day by an event in Edmonton, Alberta. Questions about Layton's health due to a recent hip surgery were often directed to him during the campaign, with Layton insisting that he was healthy enough to lead. On March 29, 2011, the New Democrats presented their first real campaign promise, a proposal to cap credit card rates in order to reduce credit card debt.

Unlike the previous election, Layton stated he was in favour of Green Party leader Elizabeth May speaking at the leaders debates, despite the fact that she was once again being discouraged by the Canadian media networks. The NDP also embarked upon the largest advertising campaign in its history, focusing on the Harper government's health care record. He also dedicated the federal election campaign to former Saskatchewan premier Allan Blakeney, who died about halfway through the campaign.

Despite entering the campaign with relatively low poll numbers, the NDP recovered and increased their support significantly after Layton's performance in the leaders debates. In the English-language debate, Layton criticized Michael Ignatieff's poor attendance record in the House of Commons, saying "You know, most Canadians, if they don't show up for work, they don't get a promotion!", to which Ignatieff was unable to respond effectively. The Globe and Mail described Layton's attack as a "knock-out punch" while the Toronto Star stated it was the "pivot in the debate [that] was a turning point in the federal campaign". Layton's New Democrats successfully capitalized on Ignatieff's attendance record in the Toronto area.

On February 4, 2011, Layton attended a rally against Usage Based Billing in Toronto with MPs Dan McTeague, Olivia Chow, Peggy Nash and others. His attendance at this rally was accompanied by several press releases by the NDP denouncing metered internet usage in Canada.

The NDP surge began in Quebec, with the NDP surprising many observers by surpassing the previously front-running Bloc in Quebec. In Canada overall, the NDP surged past the Liberals to take the second place behind the Conservatives; in Quebec, the NDP took first place. The NDP surge became the dominant narrative of the last week of the campaign, as other parties turned their attacks on the party and Layton.
 
On April 29, 2011, a retired police officer told the Sun News Network and the Toronto Sun newspaper that in 1996, Layton had been found in a massage parlour when police, looking for underage Asian sex workers, raided the establishment. The police informed Layton of the potentially questionable use of the business and recommended that he avoid it in the future. No charges were filed. The Sun later ran a follow-up piece, in which Toronto city councillor Giorgio Mammoliti criticized Layton. Layton has said there was no wrongdoing in the matter, saying that he simply "went for a massage at a community clinic" and did not return after the police advised him not to. He also referred to the release of the police report as a smear campaign against him. Bloc Québécois leader Gilles Duceppe also dismissed the claim. A columnist for the National Post suggested that it was a Liberal insider that leaked the story, although a Liberal Party spokesman denied that they had anything to do with it.

A subsequent Toronto Star column stated that most contributors to online discussions agreed there was a smear campaign against Layton. As for political damage from this story, that same day's update of the Nanos Leadership Index, which assesses public opinion on the Canadian federal leaders' trustworthiness, competence and vision for Canada, saw Layton rise from a score of 80 to a score of 97, surpassing Harper's 88 and Ignatieff's 39. The polling company speculated this improvement is due to strong sympathy by the public for a political candidate they judged as being unfairly maligned. The Toronto Police Service launched an investigation into how official police notes were leaked to Sun Media. Police notebooks are closely guarded and may contain unfounded and unproven allegations. On May 5, 2011, it was announced that no charges would be laid with regards to the leaked information.

Layton appeared on the Radio-Canada talk show Tout le monde en parle on April 3, an appearance that was credited for improving his party's standing among Francophone voters due to his informal Québécois French. The show is the most popular program in Quebec. He was also perceived to have performed well in the televised French-language party leaders' debate on April 13.

In the May 2, 2011, election, Layton led the NDP to 103 seats, more than double its previous high. This was also enough to make the NDP the Official Opposition for the first time. The NDP gains were partly due to a major surge in Quebec as the party won 59 of the province's 75 seats, dominating Montreal and sweeping Quebec City and the Outaouais, although the NDP also won more seats than any other opposition party in the rest of Canada. The NDP had gone into the election with only one seat in Quebec, that of Thomas Mulcair, and had won but a single seat in the province historically (Phil Edmonston in a 1990 by-election). Many of these gains came at the expense of the Bloc, which was reduced to a four-seat rump without official party status in Parliament.

Illness and death

 
On February 5, 2010, Layton announced that he had been diagnosed with prostate cancer. He noted that his father Robert Layton had the same type of cancer 17 years before and recovered from it. His wife, Olivia Chow, had thyroid cancer a few years before. He vowed to beat the cancer, and said it would not interrupt his duties as member of Parliament or as leader of the NDP.

Following the 2011 federal election, Layton led the party into the first month of the new session of Parliament, as well as attending the NDP Federal Convention in Vancouver. After Parliament rose for the summer, Layton announced on July 25, 2011 that he would be taking a temporary leave from his post to fight an unspecified, newly diagnosed cancer. He was hoping to return as leader of the NDP upon the resumption of the House of Commons on September 19, 2011. Layton recommended that NDP caucus chair Nycole Turmel serve as interim leader during his leave of absence.

Layton died at 4:45 am ET on Monday, August 22, 2011, at his home in Toronto. He was 61 years old.

Upon hearing the news, there was a nationwide outpouring of grief, and Governor General David Johnston, Prime Minister Stephen Harper, NDP deputy leader Libby Davies, and the US ambassador to Canada, David Jacobson issued statements praising Layton and mourning his loss. Layton's family released an open letter, written by Layton two days before his death. In it, he expressed his wishes regarding the NDP's leadership in the event of his death, and addressed various segments of the Canadian population, concluding, "My friends, love is better than anger. Hope is better than fear. Optimism is better than despair. So let us be loving, hopeful and optimistic. And we'll change the world."

Layton was accorded a state funeral, which took place between August 25 and 27, 2011, with the final memorial service at Roy Thomson Hall in Toronto. Layton was the second leader of the Official Opposition to die while in office; the first, Sir Wilfrid Laurier, had been a former prime minister, and had been given a state funeral under the protocol for prime ministers. Layton was the first Official Opposition leader to die for whom a state funeral would not otherwise have been afforded, but Prime Minister Harper made the offer to Layton's widow who accepted. Layton's body was cremated following the funeral. A portion of his ashes was scattered under a jack pine planted on Toronto Island in his honour, with a second portion scattered at the Layton family's plot at Cote St. Charles United Church in Hudson, Quebec. A third portion was scattered under a memorial sculpted by Chow, placed at the Toronto Necropolis Cemetery on the first anniversary of his death.

In popular culture
Layton's life is portrayed in a 2013 television movie entitled Jack, with Rick Roberts portraying Layton and Sook-Yin Lee as Olivia Chow. The cast also includes Wendy Crewson and Erin Karpluk. It was released on March 10, 2013, and aired on CBC Television.

Electoral history

Legacy and honours

 The Jack Layton Ferry Terminal in Toronto was renamed in Layton's honour in 2013, on the second anniversary of his death. A bronze statue of Layton riding on a tandem bicycle was installed at the site.
 Jack Layton Way in Toronto was named in 2013 (formerly Don Jail Roadway and parking area in front of the old jail). The street was once part of the driveway to the Don Jail and now being transformed as part of the Bridgepoint Health redevelopment in the Toronto neighbourhood of Riverdale; the community is in Layton's former electoral district of Toronto—Danforth. South side of the roadway is Toronto Public Library Riverdale Branch and Hubbard Park (named after William Peyton Hubbard.)
 Ryerson University (now Toronto Metropolitan University), where Layton was a professor for many years, honoured him by creating the Jack Layton Chair in the Department of Politics and Public Administration. The endowment sponsors several events including the annual Jack Layton Lecture series, the Jack Layton Book Club held in conjunction with Ryerson Archives and which holds discussions about various books that are part of the archive's Jack Layton Collection. As well, the chair sponsors the annual Jack Layton School for Leadership, an annual program aimed at building the leadership capacity of leaders and activists working towards social change.
 The Broadbent Institute awards an annual Jack Layton Progress Prize to "recognize the person or organization that has created and fielded an exceptional and successful campaign for progressive change."
 Parc Jack-Layton in Layton's hometown of Hudson, Quebec, was named in 2012. Previously known as Hudson Marina, the park is located by the shore of Lake of Two Mountains. Layton's widow, Olivia Chow, along with family members and MP Tom Mulcair, attended the renaming ceremony.
 A plaque commemorating Layton was unveiled in 2013 in Toronto's Withrow Park in front on an oak tree that was planted in his memory.
 The educational organization Learning for a Sustainable Future has established the LSF Jack Layton Award for Youth Action in Sustainability to honour schools that have "responded to community challenges with creativity, responsible citizenship and innovative action".
 Toronto's Woodgreen Community Services renamed their seniors' housing building at 1070 Queen Street East, Jack Layton Seniors' Housing in honour of Layton.
 The national headquarters of the federal NDP was named the "Jack Layton Building" after him.

Selected works
 
 
  (revised and expanded edition of Speaking Out: Ideas that Work For Canadians)

Notes

References

External links
 New Democratic Party – NDP official website
 

1950 births
2011 deaths
Anglophone Quebec people
Canadian activists
Canadian monarchists 
Canadian people of English descent
Canadian people of German descent 
Canadian political scientists
Canadian social democrats
Deaths from cancer in Ontario
Leaders of the Opposition (Canada)
McGill University alumni
Members of the House of Commons of Canada from Ontario
Members of the King's Privy Council for Canada
Members of the United Church of Canada
Metropolitan Toronto councillors
NDP and CCF leaders
New Democratic Party MPs
People from Montérégie
Politicians from Montreal
Writers from Montreal
Jack Layton
Academic staff of Toronto Metropolitan University
Toronto city councillors
York University alumni
Canadian non-fiction writers
Academic staff of York University
Academic staff of the University of Toronto
Writers from Toronto
Canadian political writers
Recipients of the Meritorious Service Decoration
Spouses of Canadian politicians
21st-century Canadian politicians
Burials at Toronto Necropolis
Progressivism in Canada